Suray is a surname. Notable people with the surname include:

Olivier Suray (born 1971), Belgian footballer and manager
Gil Suray, Belgian bike racer